The Intraurban Sanctuary of Demeter and Persephone was an intraurban sanctuary in ancient Cyrene in Libya, dedicated to Demeter and Persephone.

The sanctuary was located on the north-west edge of the agora.  It was founded in 7th-century BC, and the predecessor of the larger and more monumental Extramural Sanctuary of Demeter and Persephone at Cyrene, Libya, which was founded somewhat later.  Initially, it was a small temple, hypaethral, and consisting of a peribolos wall and two altars.  In the 6th century BC, the temenos of the temple was enlarged until it surrounded an area of about 13×13 metres. The Intraurban Sanctuary was used at least until the Extramural Sanctuary was completed and fully operational.

References

Sources
 Susan-Marie Cronkite,  The Sanctuary of Demeter at Mytilene: A Diachronic and Contextual Study. Volume Two Catalogue, 1997, Institute of Archaeology, University College London
 Bacchiefli, Lidiano, 1981. VA, gora di Cirene H lp 27–39. Rome: LTrma di 'Bretschneider Monografle di Archaeologia Libica XV.

Temples of Demeter
Temples of Persephone
7th-century BC religious buildings and structures
Archaeological sites in Libya
Ancient Cyrenaica